"Honeycomb" is a popular song written by Bob Merrill in 1954. The best-selling version was recorded by Jimmie Rodgers and charted at number one on the Billboard Top 100 in 1957. "Honeycomb" also reached number one on the R&B Best Sellers chart and number seven on the Country & Western Best Sellers in Stores chart. It became a gold record. The song is referenced in the McGuire Sisters hit song "Sugartime", in which the soloist sings the line "Just be my honeycomb" and the word "honeycomb" is echoed by the other sisters and the male chorus.

In 2020, Jimmie Rodgers' version was featured in the Netflix psychological thriller film, The Devil All the Time.

Cover versions
 In 1986, Gary Morris' version of the song was a country hit, peaking at number twenty-seven.
 Ricky Nelson covered the song on his 1957 debut album Ricky.
 In 1965, the Ray Conniff Singers covered the song on their album Invisible Tears. 
 Brian Wilson covered the song in 2021. Footage of Brian Wilson recording it can be seen in the 2021 documentary Brian Wilson: Long Promised Road, and the finished recording has been issued on that documentary's soundtrack.

See also
List of Billboard number-one singles of 1957
List of Billboard number-one rhythm and blues hits
Billboard year-end top 50 singles of 1957
List of Cash Box Best Sellers number-one singles of 1957
List of CHUM number-one singles of 1957

References

External links
 

Songs written by Bob Merrill
1954 songs
1957 singles
1986 singles
Billboard Top 100 number-one singles
Jimmie Rodgers (pop singer) songs
Ricky Nelson songs
Gary Morris songs
Warner Records singles
Roulette Records singles